The super-prefectures of Greece (υπερνομαρχίες, sing. υπερνομαρχία) were a second-degree organization of local self-government and an administrative division between the regions and the prefectures. They were each headed by an elected but largely ceremonial super-prefect, with most of the prefectural duties performed by the prefects under the super-prefect. The super-prefectures were:

Athens-Piraeus super-prefecture (Υπερνομαρχία Αθηνών-Πειραιώς or Νομαρχιακή Αυτοδιοίκηση Αθηνών - Πειραιώς)
Drama-Kavala-Xanthi Super-prefecture
Rhodope-Evros Super-prefecture

See also
 Attica Prefecture

Former subdivisions of Greece
Prefectures